Jitadih is a village in panchayat- Murhan-Jamin,  block- Goradih, district- Bhagalpur , state- Bihar.

Villages in Bhagalpur district